Piedmont Airlines, Inc. is an American regional airline headquartered at the Salisbury Regional Airport in Wicomico County, Maryland, near the city of Salisbury. The airline is a wholly-owned subsidiary of the American Airlines Group and it is paid by fellow group member American Airlines to staff, operate and maintain aircraft used on American Eagle flights that are scheduled, marketed and sold by American Airlines. Piedmont also provides ground handling and customer service for airports in the northeastern and western United States.

Piedmont operates a fleet consisting of exclusively Embraer ERJ145 regional jet aircraft. Its main base is Philadelphia International Airport with an additional hub at Charlotte Douglas International Airport. The company has a team of more than 9,800 employees, operating flights to nearly 50 destinations.

Started in 1961 as Henson Airlines, the airline was rebranded in 1993 to re-use the name of Piedmont Airlines (1948–1989), one of the predecessors of today's American Airlines, to protect the brand.

History
The airline was formed in 1961 by Richard A. Henson as Henson Aviation, a fixed-base operator in Hagerstown, Maryland. It began its first scheduled flights to Washington National Airport in 1962 under the Hagerstown Commuter name, later changed to Henson Airlines.  Allegheny Airlines (which became US Airways, which in turn has now merged with American Airlines) and Henson began one of the world's first code sharing arrangements in 1967. Henson re-branded itself as an Allegheny Commuter carrier using Beechcraft 99 aircraft.  It initially developed a route structure serving Washington D.C., Philadelphia and Baltimore, while establishing a new headquarters for Allegheny Commuter at Salisbury, Maryland in 1968. In the 1970s, the airline upgraded to Short 330 and de Havilland Canada Dash 7 turboprops.

In 1983, Piedmont Aviation bought Henson Airlines and re-branded the airline as "Henson, The Piedmont Regional Airline." Under Piedmont's control, the airline expanded rapidly, particularly in Florida. Both were purchased by the USAir Group in 1987 with Piedmont absorbed two years later and Henson's aircraft repainted in USAir Express livery.  The 1980s saw rapid growth by the company with the upgrade of its fleet to the de Havilland Canada Dash 8 aircraft and fleet expansion.  With the growth in capacity, the airline expanded to Florida, including numerous intrastate routes in Florida, and it opened a maintenance facility in Jacksonville.

The Piedmont name was resurrected in 1993, when USAir (the erstwhile Allegheny Airlines that became US Airways) renamed Henson to "Piedmont Airlines", to protect the Piedmont brand name, which could be used by others if not exercised in trade use for a period of time. USAir continued this practice by changing the name of its two other wholly owned regional airline subsidiaries, Jetstream and Suburban Airlines, to PSA Airlines and Allegheny Airlines, respectively. (Pacific Southwest Airlines was the name of a California-based airline merged into USAir.)  In 1997, USAir was renamed US Airways, and Piedmont and Allegheny were likewise re-branded as US Airways Express carriers. US Airways merged Allegheny Airlines into Piedmont in 2004.

Operations
The airline had more than 10,000 employees, as of August 2022, and operated nearly 400 daily flights to more than 55 destinations.

As of January 2022, Piedmont is currently the exclusive operator at Williamsport Regional Airport, Pitt–Greenville Airport, Florence Regional Airport, Watertown International Airport, and Salisbury Regional Airport.

Piedmont Airlines currently flies under the American Eagle brand, after a merger of American Airlines and US Airways in December 2013.

The airline operates maintenance bases in Albany, Charlotte, Harrisburg, Philadelphia, Richmond, Roanoke and Salisbury. Piedmont has crew bases in Charlotte, Harrisburg, and Philadelphia.

Fleet

As of March 2023, the Piedmont Airlines fleet consists of the following aircraft:

Retired fleet

Incidents and accidents
On September 23, 1985, Henson Airlines Flight 1517, a Beechcraft Model B99 turboprop, crashed near Grottoes, Virginia. The crash was fatal to all 12 passengers and both crewmembers. This was the first fatality of a female commercial U.S. pilot, First Officer Zilda A. Spadaro-Wolan. The National Transportation Safety Board concluded that part of the probable cause of the crash was the airline's failure to standardize the cockpit configurations of its aircraft and on its failure to provide adequate training to its pilots.
On November 16, 2008, US Airways Express Flight 4551, a Piedmont Airlines-operated Dash 8 turboprop, took off from Lehigh Valley International Airport at 8:20am heading to Philadelphia International Airport, had to make an emergency landing.  The flight crew was indicated that the front nose gear hadn't come down and had to make a flyover the runway for confirmation. Of 35 passengers and 3 crew, there were no injuries. The aircraft (N326EN) incurred only minor damage and was returned to service.
On January 1, 2011, US Airways Express Flight 4352, a Piedmont Airlines-operated Dash 8-100 turboprop forced an evacuation of the U.S. Capitol and fighter jets were scrambled from Andrews Air Force Base after Flight 4352 suffered radio problems on approach to Washington, DC's Ronald Reagan Washington National Airport and strayed into restricted airspace. The Capitol was evacuated for approximately 20 minutes until the Dash 8 aircraft landed at Reagan National Airport.
On January 7, 2011, US Airways Express Flight 4507, a Piedmont Airlines-operated Dash 8-100 turboprop from Philadelphia International Airport to Tweed New Haven Regional Airport in Connecticut was struck by lightning over the Long Island Sound. The captain reported electrical problems and diverted safely to Long Island MacArthur Airport due to more favorable weather conditions. The aircraft had 33 passengers aboard who were then bussed to New Haven.
On May 18, 2013, US Airways Express Flight 4560 made a belly landing at Newark Liberty International Airport after landing gear would not extend. All passengers and crew members were evacuated safely.
On December 31, 2022, a Piedmont Airlines ground worker was killed after being ingested into the engine of an Embraer 175 aircraft operated by  Envoy Air at Montgomery Regional Airport in Montgomery, Alabama. The incident caused flights at Montgomery Airport to be temporarily grounded.

See also
Air transportation in the United States
List of airlines of the United States
List of airports in the United States
Transportation in the United States

References

External links

 

1961 establishments in Maryland
Airlines based in Maryland
Airlines established in 1961
American Airlines Group
American companies established in 1961
Regional Airline Association members
Regional airlines of the United States
Salisbury, Maryland
US Airways Group
Wicomico County, Maryland